Dasypsyllus comatus is a species of flea in the family Ceratophyllidae. It was described by Karl Jordan in 1933.

References 

Ceratophyllidae
Insects described in 1933